This is a season-by-season list of records compiled by Holy Cross in men's ice hockey.

The College of the Holy Cross has made two appearances in the NCAA Tournament, winning what is widely regarded as the biggest upset in the history of the championship.

Season-by-season results

Note: GP = Games played, W = Wins, L = Losses, T = Ties

* Winning percentage is used when conference schedules are unbalanced.

Footnotes

References

 
Lists of college men's ice hockey seasons in the United States
Holy Cross Crusaders ice hockey seasons